Bruno Kuehne is an Austrian para-alpine skier. He won the gold medal in the Men's Super-G B1 event at the 1992 Winter Paralympics held in Tignes and Albertville, France. He also represented Austria at the 1988 Winter Paralympics and at the 1994 Winter Paralympics. At the 1996 Summer Paralympics he competed in several cycling events.

See also 
 List of Paralympic medalists in alpine skiing

References 

Living people
Year of birth missing (living people)
Place of birth missing (living people)
Paralympic alpine skiers of Austria
Alpine skiers at the 1988 Winter Paralympics
Alpine skiers at the 1992 Winter Paralympics
Alpine skiers at the 1994 Winter Paralympics
Medalists at the 1992 Winter Paralympics
Paralympic gold medalists for Austria
Paralympic medalists in alpine skiing
20th-century Austrian people